Senator Laird may refer to:

Melvin R. Laird Sr. (1877–1946), Wisconsin State Senate
Melvin Laird (1922–2016), Wisconsin State Senate
William Laird III (1916–1974), U.S. Senator from West Virginia in 1956
William Laird IV (born 1952), West Virginia State Senate